A list of films produced by the Marathi language film industry based in Maharashtra in the year 1976.

1976 Releases
A list of Marathi films released in 1976.

References

Lists of 1976 films by country or language
1976 in Indian cinema
1976